Jean-Pierre Robert (Tours, France) is a French double bass musician and author.

Career 
In 1979, Robert won first prize of double bass of Conservatoire de Paris. He joined Ensemble l'Itinéraire, where he remained until 2003. He has numerous collaborations with Ensemble Intercontemporain of Pierre Boulez, while claiming an "almighty need to dislearn ".

In 1983 he was invited by Paul Mefano for a solo performance of the 1st Radiophonic creation of Theraps by Yannis Xenakis on the stage of the Centre Pompidou. He performed at the Festival d'Avignon, the Festival de La Rochelle with Pierre-Yves Artaud and the Orchestre Philharmonique de Radio-France, Internationale Ferienkurse für Neue Musik - Darmstadt -, Festival de Radio France et Montpellier, with the music of Philippe Boivin, Georges Aperghis, Iannis Xenakis, and Horatiu Radulescu.

In 1986, he began writing Modes of Playing the Double Bass (édited by Musica Guild), within the framework of a collaboration with IRCAM, a stake with playing techniques.

Biography and Catalogues of Works :https://ircam.academia.edu/JEANPIERREROBERT/CurriculumVitae

External links
 
 Review Presto Classical
 IRCAM
 Anne Salliot, 1994
 

1956 births
French installation artists
Contemporary classical music performers
French classical double-bassists
Male double-bassists
Musicians from Tours, France
Living people
21st-century double-bassists
21st-century French male musicians
Writers from Tours, France